Heliophanus pistaciae is a jumping spider species in the genus Heliophanus.  It was first described by Wanda Wesołowska in 2003 and lives in South Africa and Zimbabwe.

References

Salticidae
Arthropods of Zimbabwe
Spiders of South Africa
Spiders of Africa
Spiders described in 2003
Taxa named by Wanda Wesołowska